James Mathew Dillon (26 September 1902 – 10 February 1986) was an Irish Fine Gael politician who served as Leader of the Opposition and Leader of Fine Gael from 1959 to 1965 and Minister for Agriculture from 1948 to 1951 and 1954 to 1957. He served as a Teachta Dála (TD) from 1932 to 1969.

Early and personal life
Dillon was born at 2 North Great George's Street, Dublin. He was the son of John Dillon, the last leader of the Irish Parliamentary Party (1918), and Elizabeth Mathew. He was educated at Mount St Benedict's, in Gorey, County Wexford, University College Dublin and King's Inns. He qualified as a barrister and was called to the Bar in 1931. Dillon studied business methods at Selfridges in London. After some time at Marshall Field's in Chicago he returned to Ireland where he became manager of the family business known as Monica Duff's in Ballaghaderreen, County Roscommon.

In 1942, while on holiday in Carna, County Galway he met Maura Phelan of Clonmel on a Friday. By the following Monday the two were engaged and six weeks after that, they married. He was 40, and she was 22 years of age.

Political career
Between 1932 and 1937, Dillon served as a TD for the Donegal constituency for the National Centre Party and after its merger with Cumann na nGaedheal, for the new party of Fine Gael. Dillon played a key role in instigating the creation of Fine Gael and would become a key member of the party in later years. He remained as TD for Monaghan from 1937 to 1969. Dillon became deputy leader of Fine Gael under W. T. Cosgrave.

He resigned from Fine Gael in 1942 over its stance on Irish neutrality during World War II. While Fine Gael supported the government's decision to stay out of the war, Dillon urged the government to side with the Allies. A passionate anti-Nazi, Dillon described the Nazi creed as "the devil himself with twentieth-century efficiency". His zeal against Hitler drew him the ire of the German Minister to Ireland Eduard Hempel, who denounced him as a "Jew" and "German-hater". Even Éamon de Valera, then Taoiseach, was not spared the fierceness of Dillon's rhetoric; when the Taoiseach ridiculed Dillon's stark support for the Allies, noting this meant he had to adopt a Pro-British stance, Dillon defiantly retorted :
 In 1944, as the danger of allied defeat receded he was approached by Fine Gael to rejoin the party and offered the leadership, on condition he relinquished his views on neutrality, especially since they were no longer strategically important. He refused – ironically, had he accepted he might well have been taoiseach in 1948.

Dillon was one of the Independents TD who was part of the first inter-party government (1948–1951), and was appointed Minister for Agriculture. As minister, Dillon was responsible for huge improvements in Irish agriculture. Money was spent on land reclamation projects in the areas of less fertile land while the overall quality of Irish agricultural produce increased.

Dillon rejoined Fine Gael in May 1952. He became Minister for Agriculture again in the second inter-party government (1954–1957). In 1959, Dillon became leader of Fine Gael, succeeding Richard Mulcahy. He became president of the party in 1960. In 1965, Fine Gael lost the general election to Seán Lemass and Fianna Fáil. The non-Fianna Fáil parties won 69 seats to Fianna Fáil's 72. Having narrowly failed to become Taoiseach, Dillon stood down as Fine Gael leader after the election.

On Northern Ireland, while Dillon stood against Partition, he equally opposed any "armed solution" or militant nationalist policy, stating:

Dillon was a colourful contributor to Dáil proceedings and was noted for his high standard of oratory. He remained a TD until 1969, when he retired from politics. He died in Ballaghaderreen, County Roscommon in 1986 at the age of 83.

References

Further reading

1902 births
1986 deaths
Alumni of University College Dublin
Irish barristers
Irish farmers
Leaders of Fine Gael
Members of the 7th Dáil
Members of the 8th Dáil
Members of the 9th Dáil
Members of the 10th Dáil
Members of the 11th Dáil
Members of the 12th Dáil
Members of the 13th Dáil
Members of the 14th Dáil
Members of the 15th Dáil
Members of the 16th Dáil
Members of the 17th Dáil
Members of the 18th Dáil
Ministers for Agriculture (Ireland)
National Centre Party (Ireland) TDs
Politicians from County Dublin
Presidential appointees to the Council of State (Ireland)
20th-century Irish lawyers
Independent TDs
Fine Gael TDs
Alumni of King's Inns
People from Dublin (city)